The Geological Society of Glasgow is a scientific society devoted to the study of geology in Scotland.

The society contributed to the understanding of Scotland's glacial history, and the relationship between the Earth's rotation and climate change.
The Geological Society of Glasgow is registered as a charity in Scotland.

History
The society was founded on 17 May 1858, by a group of amateur geology enthusiasts. The society organized its first field trip, to Campsie Glen, in June of that year. Some fossils from these early excursions are on display in the Kelvingrove Museum in Glasgow.

The society continues to attract lecturers at the forefront of the field, and publishes field guides of the Glasgow region.

Programs
Each summer, the society runs day-long and residential field trips, open to members.

Each winter, the society hosts a lecture series, open to all, in the Boyd Orr Building at Glasgow University.

Publications
The Transactions of the Geological Society of Glasgow, first published in 1860, is available online as part of the Geological Society of London's Lyell Collection. The Transactions included papers by James Croll, Archibald Geikie, Lord Kelvin, and Joseph Tyrrell. In 1965, the Transactions merged with the Transactions of the Edinburgh Geological Society to form the Scottish Journal of Geology.

Notable people

Presidents
Former presidents have included:
 James Smith of Jordanhill (1864–1867)
 William Thomson, 1st Baron Kelvin (1872-1893)
 Archibald Geikie (1893-1899)
 Charles Lapworth (1899-1902)
 Ramsay Traquair (1902–1905)
 Ben Peach (1905-1908)
 John Walter Gregory (1908-1911 & 1914-1917)

Other notable members
 Archibald Lamont
 Elizabeth Gray, Scottish fossil hunter, became honorary member in 1900
 Thomas King, Scottish botanist

Thomas Neville George Medal recipients
Recipients of the Thomas Neville George Medal, awarded by the society, include:
 Stephen Jay Gould, American palaeontologist and science writer (1989)
 Peter Ziegler, Swiss geologist (1989)
 William James Kennedy, British geologist (1992)
 Richard Fortey, British palaeontologist, writer and television presenter (2007)
 Jenny Clack, English paleontologist (2013)

See also
Geology of Scotland
Climate change (modern day)
Climate change (general concept)

References

Glasgow
Scientific organizations established in 1858
Clubs and societies in Glasgow
Charities based in Glasgow
Science and technology in Glasgow
1858 establishments in Scotland